The Bucharest Stock Exchange (BVB) (Romanian: Bursa de Valori București) is the stock exchange of Romania located in Bucharest. In 2019, the capitalization of BVB increased 23.4% compared to the previous year, to the value of EUR 37.8 billion.  there were 83 companies listed on the BVB.

The capitalization of the Romanian capital market in relation to GDP was of 17.9% at the end of 2019. That same year, the stock exchange indices reached their highest level in the past 10 years. The BET index went up 35% and the BET-TR rose more rapidly, by 47%, against the dividends distributed by the companies.

, the most liquid company within the BVB’s main (Regular) market was Banca Transilvania (TLV), which owns approximately 30% of the total traded value. The following most liquid companies were Fondul Proprietatea (FP), BRD - Groupe Société Générale (BRD), Romgaz (SNG) and OMV Petrom (SNP).

In September 2020, the Bucharest Stock Exchange was promoted from the category of Frontier Market to the category of Secondary Emerging Market by the FTSE Russell rating agency.

History
Beginnings of the history of the Bucharest Stock Exchange can be traced back to 1839, when the commodities-trade exchanges were established in Bucharest. It was nevertheless only on December 1, 1882 that the BVB was officially inaugurated. One week later, the first exchange rates begun being published in the Official Gazette. Throughout its early existence, the activities of the Bucharest Stock Exchange were affected by the socio-political events of the time, such as the Romanian Uprising of 1907 or the Balkan Wars that took place between 1912 and 1913. The stock exchange was moreover closed during the First World War. When BVB re-opened following the end of the war, it went through a period of 7 years of significant growth, followed by a period of 7 years of accelerated loss.

In 1948 the activity of the Market for Effects, Actions and Exchange was stopped, with the establishment of the Communist regime in Romania and the beginning of the nationalisation process. At that time, shares issued by 93 companies and 77 fixed-income instruments (bond type) were listed on the Bucharest Stock Exchange. 

The Bucharest Stock Exchange reopened again in 1995, after almost 50 years of being shut down by the Communist regime. The first trading session was carried out on November 20, 1995. On that date, 905 shares issued by 6 listed companies were traded. In 2005, BVB absorbed RASDAQ – the over-the-counter electronic stock market. On February 14, 2008, Erste Bank listed on BVB and became the first international company listed on the regulated market. 

Subsequently, Bucharest Stock Exchange experienced continuous development and was established as the main stock exchange in Romania. In 2010, Bucharest Stock Exchange listed on its own spot regulated market under the symbol BVB. In 2010, the Alternative trading system was launched by BVB for SMEs and start-up companies wanting to raise capital from the market. At the end of 2014, it was announced that the equities segment of the ATS market will be re-launched under a new name 'AeRO' which stands for Alternative Exchange in Romania. AeRO was officially relaunched on February 25, 2015 during an official opening of the trading session during which two companies debuted - Delivery Solutions (symbol: SDAY) and Carpathia Capital (CRPC). AeRO targets early stage companies, to finance their projects, growth stories, increase their visibility and contribute to the development of the business environment.

On December 15, 2014 BVB has launched a new website, synchronized with all the channels used by BVB, including social media pages. On March 27, 2015, BVB announced that it was joining the United Nations Sustainable Stock Exchanges initiative making it the 19th stock exchange to join. The Bucharest Stock Exchange is a member of the Federation of Euro-Asian Stock Exchanges.

Activities

The Bucharest Stock Exchange is a market and system operator authorized by the Financial Supervisory Authority (FSA) that manages a Regulated market (RM) and an Alternative Trading System (ATS) compatible with European standards. BVB also operates a market section called RASDAQ. The following types of financial instruments are traded on BVB: shares, rights, bonds, fund units, structured products and futures contracts. 
BVB operating revenues are generated mainly from trading activity, from membership and listing fees, as well as from data vending to various users.

Regulated Market

The main market of BVB is a spot regulated market where financial instruments such as shares and rights (issued by international and Romanian entities), debt instruments (corporate, municipality and government bonds) issued by Romanian entities and international corporate bonds, UCITs (shares and fund units), structured products and ETFs are traded.

In order to be listed on the regulated market, a company has to fulfill a number of requirements prior to its listing on BVB:
 Be a joint stock company (SA)
 Have the value of market capitalization / shareholders’ equity of at least 1 million euro
 Have a free-float of at least 25% (shares not owned by the company, nor by strategic investors)
 Be active on the market for the last 3 years and have available financial reports from that period.

AeRO Market

AeRO market is the equities segment of the Alternative trading system (ATS). AeRO market was designed from the need of providing a financing alternative for entrepreneurs, and is the equity segment of the alternative trading system managed by the Bucharest Stock Exchange (BVB). It is a market segment designed for listing of early stage companies, start-ups and SMEs, to finance their projects, growth stories, increase their visibility and contribute to the development of the business environment. Based on the BVB alternative trading system existing since 2010, the AeRO market, under its redesigned and reconstructed concept, was launched on February 25, 2015.

Key features of AeRO market:
It addresses all types of companies, regardless of their size or time since establishment,
It was created for both shares and bonds, as well as for other financial instruments that do not comply with the requirements of the regulated market,
The listing features are simplified, as there is no need for a prospectus to be admitted to trading, but only for a corporate presentation,
The reporting requirements are low as compared to the regulated market,
A company may prepare to get transferred on the regulated market by gradually increasing the free float, the cash.

Indices

Bucharest Stock Exchange has 8 local indices and one international:indices:

BET

BET was the first index developed by BVB. It is the reference index for the capital markets. BET follows the evolution of the 15 most liquid companies listed on BVB regulated market, excluding financial investment companies (SIFs). It is an index weighted by free float capitalization. The maximum weight of the symbol is 20%. The main selection criterion is company’s liquidity. Starting with 2015, additional requirements of transparency, quality reporting and communication with investors was imposed.
BET index structure:

Updated 13 November, 2018

BET-TR

BET-TR is the first total return index launched by BVB. It is based on the structure of market reference index BET. BET-TR reflects the evolution of its component shares and dividend yields offered by them. Index is composed of the 13 most traded companies on BVB, excluding SIFs. Similarly to BET, the main selection criterion for BET-TR is the liquidity of the company. Starting with 2015, additional requirement of transparency, quality reporting and communication with investors will be imposed. BET-TR is an index weighted by free float capitalization. The maximum weight of the symbol is 20%.

BET-FI

BET-FI is the first sectoral index launched by BVB. It reflects the evolution of financial investment companies (SIFs) and of other similar institutions.  It is an index weighted by free float capitalization. The maximum weight of the symbol is 30%.

BET-XT

BET-XT reflects the price evolution of 25 most liquid companies listed on BVB, including investment firms (SIFs). It is an index weighted by free float capitalization. The maximum weight of the symbol is 15%.

BET-NG

BET-NG is a sectoral index that reflects the evolution of companies listed on BVB regulated market that operate primarily in energy and utilities field. It is an index weighted by free float capitalization. The maximum weight of the symbol is 30%. Number of component shares is variable.

BET-BK

Index BET-BK was created as a benchmark for the fund managers and other institutional investors. The calculation methodology reflects on legal requirements as well as limits of the investment funds. It is an index weighted by free float capitalization. Number of component shares is equal 25.

BET Plus

BET Plus reflects the evolution of Romanian companies listed on BVB regulated market that meet the minimum selection criterion with regards to liquidity and free float. Financial investment companies are excluded from this index. It is an index weighted by free float capitalization. The maximum weight of the symbol is 20%. Number of component shares is variable.

BET-XT-TR

BET-XT-TR is the total return version of BET-XT index, which includes the 25 most traded Romanian companies listed at BVB. BET-XT-TR tracks the price changes of its constituent companies and is adjusted to also reflect the dividends paid by them.

ROTX

ROTX is an index developed by BVB together with the Vienna Stock Exchange (Wiener Börse). It reflects, in real-time, the movement of the ‘blue chip’ shares traded on the Bucharest Stock Exchange.  ROTX is an index weighted by free float capitalization, calculated in RON, EUR and USD and disseminated in real time by the Vienna Stock Exchange. ROTX is a tradable index and can be used as an underlying for derivatives and structured products.

Companies Listed

Some of Romania’s highest-profile companies are being traded on BVB. The largest companies by market capitalization as of November 2017 are: OMV Petrom S.A., S.N.G.N. Romgaz S.A., Banca Transilvania, BRD – Groupe Societe Generale S.A, Fondul Proprietatea, S.N.T.G.N. Transgaz S.A. and Societatea Energetica Electrica S.A.

BVB own shares

Since 2010, Bucharest Stock Exchange is listed on its own market, with a symbol BVB. Bucharest Stock Exchange has a single class of common shares and a capital of 76,741,980 lei divided in 7,674,198 shares with a nominal value of RON 10 per share. All the shares are fully paid. The free float of BVB shares is equal 100%. In accordance with the provisions of the Government Emergency Ordinance no. 90/2014 amending and supplementing the Law no. 297/2004 regarding the capital market, a shareholder of a market operator cannot own directly or indirectly more than 20% of the total voting rights. As of November 30, 2014, the Romanian legal entities constituted the largest group of the BVB shareholders (69.19%), followed by foreign legal entities (15.47%), Romanian private individuals (14.79%), and foreign private individuals (0.54%). In November 2014, European Bank for Reconstruction and Development has acquired 4.99% stake in the Bucharest Stock Exchange.

Legal Framework
The legal framework for exchange operations in Romania is provided by the following legal acts:
The Capital Market Law no. 297/2004
CNVM Regulation no. 1/2006 on Issuers and Operations with Securities
CNVM Regulation no. 2/2006 on Regulated Markets and Alternative Trading System
Additionally, the BVB is governed by Constitutive Act of the Commercial Company Bursa de Valori Bucuresti S.A. and the Regulation on the Organization and Functioning of the Bursa de Valori Bucuresti whereas the respective markets are governed by the Bucharest Stock Exchange Rulebook for Market Operators and ATS Rulebook for System Operators.

Information services
BVB supplies its participant with a wide range of tools that provide real time prices and trading data. Some of the most popular products provided by BVB are:
ArenaXT – provides investors with access to the live market data that professional traders rely on. It offers investors real-time, in-depth market information, delivered in a cost-effective and user-friendly way.
ON LINE Terminal – provides online trading information based on best prices.
ON LINE Quotes – provides online trading information per symbol.

Currently BVB provides real time data to, inter alia: Thomson Reuters, Bloomberg L.P., Standard & Poor’s and many others.

Opening times
Bucharest Stock Exchange trades daily from Monday to Friday. The hours differ depending on the market and the instrument type. The regulated market (REGS) has pre-market sessions from 9:30 – 9:45 AM Eastern European Time (EET), normal trading sessions from 9:45 - 17:55, pre-close session from 17:55 – 18:00, trading at last session from 18:00 until 18:10 PM and closed session at 18:10 PM.
The Stock Exchange does not trade on Saturdays and Sundays as well as Romanian national holiday days, declared by BVB in advance.

See also
 BET-13
 Economy of Romania
 Foreign trade of Romania
 List of companies of Romania
 List of stock exchanges

References

External links
 Bucharest Stock Exchange

1882 establishments in Romania
Stock Exchange
Stock Exchange
Stock exchanges in Europe
Economy of Romania